Charles Island is a 14-acre (57,000 m2) island located roughly 0.5 mile (1 km) off the coast of Milford, Connecticut, in Long Island Sound centered at .

Charles Island is accessible from shore via a tombolo (locally referred to as a sandbar), which is exposed at low tide.  According to early local histories, the Sachem Ansantawae resided there during the summer months.  European discovery of the island occurred in 1614 when Adriaen Block sailed through and mapped Long Island Sound.  The island appears on his hand-drawn map found in The Netherlands National Archives.

Access
Though an island during high tide, during low tide it is accessible by foot using a rocky tombolo that stretches from the beach to the island.  Visitors are cautioned about the strong undertow and twice-daily flooding of the sandbar as a result of the tides.  Currently (2005) the crossing window is at least two hours.  However, Milford locals note that earlier in the 20th century the window was much greater, but erosion has reduced the size and width of the island and sandbar.

Access to Charles Island via the sandbar is closed from dates including May 1 to August 31 to protect the bird population per sign posted and Connecticut Department of Energy and Environmental Protection. 

Kayakers paddling on the side of the island not facing the Connecticut shore can be surprised by the wind and rougher waves, according to a spokesman for the Milford Fire Department. At about 2 a.m. on September 6, 2009, a 22-year-old kayaker went missing after his boat capsized. Another man with him swam to safety, but after more than a month, the victim's body had not been found.

History
Originally known as Poquehaug,
after the area was settled by the English in 1639 the island was referred to as Milford Island.  After Charles Deal bought the island in 1657 it became known as Charles Island.  Deal made a failed attempt to raise tobacco on the island – one of the first such efforts in Connecticut.

The WPA History of Milford indicates that Captain William Kidd visited Milford in 1699 when he was en route to Boston (where he was subsequently arrested for piracy and murder).  Before Kidd's arrival in Boston, he off-loaded and buried treasure on Gardiners Island off the eastern tip of Long Island.  The treasure was retrieved after his arrest but questions remain as to whether all the treasure was in that cache and whether he may have buried more of it along Long Island Sound.

In 1835, the first permanent residence was constructed on the island by John Harris.  After his death the island was owned by several different owners and in 1852 it was purchased by Elizur Pritchard of Waterbury, Connecticut who turned the large house into a summer resort known originally as Charles Island House and later as Ansantawae House.  After the Civil War the resort closed and the island was leased to the George Miles Company as a base for their fish fertilizer operations.  

In 1884, the island was briefly considered as a location for the first clubhouse of American Yacht Club. 

After the Miles Company left the island it was relatively unused until the 1930s when the Dominican Order opened a religious retreat on the island.  The Aquinas Retreat consisted of a chapel, small cabins for the retreatants, a central dining hall and religious shrines located along paths throughout the island.  The retreat closed in the late 1930s and some remnants of it remain on the island.

Modern era
The State of Connecticut now owns the island and it is part of Silver Sands State Park.  It is designated a Natural Area Preserve for the local bird population of herons and egrets. White-tail deer were common, but the estimated 16 deer on the island were hunted by the Department of Environment Protection (now the Department of Energy and Environmental Protection) in February 2011 to protect the nesting birds.  The waters around the island have bluefish, snapper blues, sand sharks, and horseshoe crabs.

Further reading
Dooling, Michael C.  An Historical Account of Charles Island. The Carrollton Press, 2006
History of Milford 1639-1939. Federal Writers' Project, 1939
Lambert, Edward R. History of the Colony of New Haven.  New Haven: Hitchcock and Stafford, 1838
Cheri Revai Haunted Connecticut. Stackpole Books, 2006
David E. Philips Legends of Pirate Gold Legendary Connecticut, Curbstone Press, 2001

References

External links
 New England Site.com. "The Curse of Charles Island, Charles Island History".
 Department of Energy and Environmental Protection

Coastal islands of Connecticut
Milford, Connecticut
Landforms of New Haven County, Connecticut
Long Island Sound
Tidal islands of the United States